Glan prism or Glan polarizer may refer to:
Glan–Thompson prism, a polarizer made from cemented calcite prisms
Glan–Foucault prism, a polarizer made from air-spaced calcite prisms
Glan–Taylor prism, an improved air-spaced calcite polarizer design
Glan–laser prism, a high-power Glan–Taylor prism